Marina Melnikova was the defending champion, but chose not to participate.

Magdaléna Rybáriková won the title defeating Heather Watson in the final, 6–4, 7–5.

Seeds

Draw

Finals

Top half

Bottom half

External Links
Main Draw

Aegon Surbiton Trophy - Singles
2017 Women's Singles
Surbiton Trophy